Oregon Square is a collection of low-rise office buildings in Portland, Oregon's Lloyd District, in the United States. It hosts a year-round farmer's market. American Assets Trust plans to start construction on a major renovation at Oregon Square in spring or summer of 2016.

References

Lloyd District, Portland, Oregon
Northeast Portland, Oregon
Buildings and structures in Portland, Oregon